

dr

dra-dri
draflazine (INN)
Dralserp
Dralzine
dramedilol (INN)
draquinolol (INN)
Draximage MDP
drazidox (INN)
dribendazole (INN)
Dricort
drinabant (INN)
drinidene (INN)
Drisdol
Drixoral
Drize

dro

drob-drot
drobuline (INN)
drocinonide (INN)
droclidinium bromide (INN)
drofenine (INN)
Drolban
droloxifene (INN)
drometrizole (INN)
Dromostanolone (Eli Lilly)
dronedarone hydrochloride (USAN)
dronabinol (INN)
dronedarone (INN)
dropempine (INN)
droperidol (INN)
droprenilamine (INN)
dropropizine (INN)
drospirenone (INN)
drostanolone (INN)
drotaverine (INN)
drotebanol (INN)
drotrecogin alfa (INN)

drox-droz
droxacin (INN)
Droxia
droxicainide (INN)
droxicam (INN)
droxidopa (INN)
droxinavir (INN)
droxypropine (INN)
drozitumab (USAN)

dt
Dtic-Dome
DTIC-Dome (Bayer)
DTPA

du

dua-dup
Duac
duazomycin (INN)
dulaglutide (USAN)
dulanermin (USAN, INN)
dulofibrate (INN)
duloxetine (INN)
dulozafone (INN)
dumorelin (INN)
Duo-Medihaler
Duocaine
duometacin (INN)
Duoneb
duoperone (INN)
Duphalac
dupracetam (INN)
 DUB-care Anti-Fibrinolytic (Burgeon pharma)

dur-duv
Durabolin-50 (Organon)
Durabolin (Redirects to Nandrolone)
Duracillin A.S.
Duraclon
Duradyne DHC
Duragesic
Duramorph PF
Duranest
Duraphyl
Duraquin
Duricef
dutacatib (INN)
dutasteride (INN)
duteplase (INN)
dutogliptin (USAN, INN)
duvoglustat (USAN, INN)
Duvoid

dv-dy
Dv
Dyazide
Dycill
Dyclone
dyclonine (INN)
dydrogesterone (INN)
dihydrocodeine  (INN)
Dymelor
Dyna-Hex
Dynabac
Dynacirc
Dynapen
Dyrenium